Mahonia breviracema is a shrub in the  Berberidaceae described as a species in 1985. It is endemic to China, native to Guangxi and probably Guizhou Provinces.

References

breviracema
Endemic flora of China
Plants described in 1985